Stigmella crenulatae is a moth of the family Nepticulidae. It is found on the Canary Islands and the Iberian Peninsula.

The larvae feed on Rhamnus crenulata and Rhamnus lycioides. They mine the leaves of their host plant. The mine consists of a slender corridor, mostly partly following the leaf margin. The corridor widens in the end into a small blotch. The frass is concentrated in a broad central line.

External links
Fauna Europaea
bladmineerders.nl

Nepticulidae
Moths of Europe
Moths of Africa
Moths described in 1975